Steven Goldstein is an American civil rights activist.  
 
Goldstein received his B.A. from Brandeis University, an M.P.P. (Master in Public Policy) from the Harvard Kennedy School of Government, an M.S. from the Columbia University Graduate School of Journalism, and his J.D. from Columbia Law School. 

Goldstein was co-campaign manager for Jon Corzine for U.S. Senate in New Jersey in 2000.  He had previously worked for the U.S. Congress as press secretary to U.S. Senator Frank Lautenberg, and as a counsel to the U.S. House Judiciary Committee.

He worked as a television producer as well, winning 10 regional Emmy Awards before founding Garden State Equality in 2004. 

Goldstein served as CEO and chair of the group, New Jersey's statewide organization for LGBT equality, from 2004 until 2013, when he stepped down to take a post at Rutgers University–Newark. Under his leadership, Garden State Equality advocated for the state to legalize gay marriage, and when then-Governor Christie vetoed the marriage equality bill that both houses of the New Jersey Legislature passed, the organization filed the lawsuit, Garden State Equality v. Dow, that led to same-sex marriage in New Jersey.

At Rutgers he served as Associate Chancellor for External Relations and associate professor at Rutgers Law School and in political science. He taught courses on social justice advocacy, American politics and political communication.

He was played by Steve Carell in the 2015 movie Freeheld, based on the 2008 Academy Award-winning documentary of the same name, in which Goldstein himself appeared.

From 2016 until September 2017, he was the executive director of the Anne Frank Center for Mutual Respect; during his tenure he made the organization, according to Liel Leibovitz writing in The Tablet, "one of the loudest voices in the #resistance to Trump."

Upon stepping down, he started studying for the rabbinate at the Academy for Jewish Religion in Yonkers, New York, with a Jewish Innovation Fellowship from the 92nd Street Y.

References

Living people
American LGBT rights activists
1962 births
Rutgers University faculty
Brandeis University alumni
Columbia Law School alumni
Columbia University Graduate School of Journalism alumni
Harvard Kennedy School alumni